Gonatus fabricii, the Boreo-atlantic Armhook Squid, is a squid in the family Gonatidae. It occurs in the northern Atlantic Ocean from Canada to the Barents Sea.

Until 1981, the name G. fabricii was usually misapplied to the very similar relative G. steenstrupi.

G. fabricii grows to 30 cm in mantle length.

The type specimen was collected off Greenland and is deposited at the Zoologisk Museum of Kobenhavns Universitet  in Copenhagen.

References

External links

 Close-up video of the Boreoatlantic Armhook Squid
Tree of Life web project: Gonatus fabricii

Squid
Cephalopods described in 1818